Lusik and Marut are villages located on the absolute shoreline some 57 kilometres north of Madang on the north-west coast of Papua New Guinea, and are pristine examples of a traditional coastal villages.  Lusik faces out to the open ocean, and Marut borders a bay overlooking Kabukum Island.

On the ocean shoreline some of the wonderful coastal trees which thrive under these conditions can be noticed, Barontonia or Box Fruit.  This tree is one of the few plants which flower at night to be pollinated by nectar eating bats.  As soon as the sun comes up the flower drops off.  Nearby is a Calophyllum, with its trunk growing along the ground in search of light.  At the waters edge it then grows upward towards the light.  This type of tree is extremely important for the coastal people, as the trunks from these trees is used to make the outrigger canoes needed for fishing.

Northern cassowary (Casuarius unappendiculatus), known locally as a muruk, lives in this village.  In the wild, these unique territorial  birds, not unlike an ostrich or an emu, feed almost exclusively on fallen fruit.  Males are smaller than females and alone care for the eggs and young.  Eggs are laid on bare ground.  Cassowaries are valued by villagers  for their meat and feathers.  Though wild individuals are wary and avoid man, captive birds are pugnacious and should be avoided for their sometimes lethal kick.  This specimen is allowed to range in the forest and scrub near the village, and is fed mainly by the village people.

The men and women of the village work at tending the yam and taro gardens set back in the hinterland.  During May and June the Yam Festival is held, with all helping with the harvest and sharing the crop, which is then stored in houses in the village. Celebratory feasts follow.

The housing is all built from traditional materials of bamboo walls, with Kunai grass roofing.  The flooring is made from bamboo or libum, a palm not unlike coconut.  The housing is built well clear of the ground for ventilation, and fires are often built under the house to reduce the problem of mosquitoes.  In these villages, the women do not use a kitchen (or haus kuk), but cook their meals of taro, yams, greens in coconut milk over fires in the open.

Walking from Lusik to Marut around the coast, a fine example of Strangler Fig tree can be noticed. It has grown from the base of a Calophyllum tree and has thrown out its aerial roots  to a large distance around the host tree.

At the headland between the two villages one can come to a wonderful stand of pandanus trees, with stilt roots providing nourishment and physical support for the main tree.

The tribal chief of these villages is Didol. It is alleged that his great grandparents moved to this land when it was occupied by the Sereureu, who were dwarfs with long fingers, a tail, long nose, big ears and a thick mouth.  These people lived in trees, and did not cook their food, but ate all raw.  Didol's great grandfather fought them and killed most of them, taking over their land.  It is said that a few of these people still live in the trees deep in the jungle.

The chief of the village (Kukurai) is a hereditary position.  His father took over the role after leading a band of his clansmen to battle against neighbouring clans.  In victory, he was elected Kukurai, a position then handed down to Didol after his death.  His eldest son will inherit the role in time.

Little bay near the village is home to a myriad collection of sea cucumbers or beche de mer, sea stars, corals and fish all within a few feet of the shore.

References

Populated places in Madang Province